Kolatan may refer to:
 Kolatan, Astara, Azerbaijan
 Kolatan, Masally, Azerbaijan